The women's 200 metres at the 2018 European Athletics Championships takes place at the Olympiastadion on 10 and 11 August.

Records

Schedule

Results

Round 1
First 3 in each heat (Q) and the next 5 fastest (q) advanced to the semifinals. The top 10 ranked athletes received a bye to the semifinals.

Wind:
Heat 1: -0.3 m/s, Heat 2: -0.5 m/s, Heat 3: +0.4 m/s

Semifinals
First 2 in each heat (Q) and the next 2 fastest (q) advanced to the final.

Wind:
Heat 1: +1.1 m/s, Heat 2: +1.4 m/s, Heat 3: +0.2 m/s

* Athletes who received a bye to the semifinals

Final

The medals were determined in the final.

Wind: +0.2 m/s

References

200 W
200 metres at the European Athletics Championships
Euro